The Heart of the Rockies Regional Medical Center is a regional hospital in Salida, Colorado. Licensed as a Critical Access Hospital, the medical center has 25 beds.

The hospital is a Level IV trauma center.

History
The hospital was originally founded by the Denver & Rio Grande Railroad in 1885 to serve its employees. The railroad sold the hospital to private investors in 1962, and they operated it until 1976, when it became a district hospital. The current name dates from 1989, and the hospital moved to its current location in 2008. The hospital is part of the Salida Hospital District, a special district which covers Chaffee County and portions of Saguache and Fremont counties in central Colorado.

Hospital rating data
The HealthGrades website contains the clinical quality data for Heart of the Rockies Regional Medical Center, as of 2017. For this rating section three different types of data from HealthGrades are presented: clinical quality ratings for eleven inpatient conditions and procedures, twelve patient safety indicators and the percentage of patients giving the hospital as a 9 or 10 (the two highest possible ratings).

For inpatient conditions and procedures, there are three possible ratings: worse than expected, as expected, better than expected.  For this hospital the data for this category is:
Worse than expected - 3
As expected - 8
Better than expected - 0
For patient safety indicators, there are the same three possible ratings. For this hospital safety indicators were rated as:
Worse than expected - 2
As expected - 10
Better than expected - 0
Percentage of patients rating this hospital as a 9 or 10 - 81%
Percentage of patients who on average rank hospitals as a 9 or 10 - 69%

References

External links
Hospital website

Hospitals in Colorado
Buildings and structures in Chaffee County, Colorado
Hospitals established in 1885